The Greens – The Green Alternative is a green political party in Austria.

The party was founded in 1986 under the name "Green Alternative" (Grüne Alternative), following the merger of the more conservative Green party Vereinte Grüne Österreichs (United Greens of Austria VGÖ, founded 1982) and the more progressive party Alternative Liste Österreichs (Alternative List Austria, ALÖ, founded 1982). Since 1993, the party has carried the official name Die Grünen – Die Grüne Alternative (Grüne), but refers to itself in English as "Austrian Greens". There are still differences between the former members of the old Alternative and VGÖ factions within the party, reflected in the differing approaches of the national and state parties.

Apart from ecological issues such as environmental protection, the Greens also campaign for the rights of minorities and advocate a socio-ecological (ökosozial) tax reform.  Their basic values according to their charter in 2001 are: "direct democracy, nonviolence, ecology, solidarity, feminism and self-determination". The party is a member of the European Green Party and Global Greens.

History
In 1978 the Austrian Green movement began with the successful campaign to prevent the opening of the nuclear power plant in Zwentendorf (which had been favoured by Bruno Kreisky's government), the Green Party was born in 1984 during the sit-in protests which prevented the Danube power plant at Hainburg from being built.

Federal level
In the 1986 parliamentary elections the Green Party started off with 4.82% of all votes cast and entered parliament with eight National Council mandates.  In the early elections to National Council in 2002, the Green Party nationwide received 9.47% of votes, and won 17 mandates to the National Council.  At that time, it was the highest number of votes garnered by any European Green party.

When the Greens took their seats in parliament for the first time, they chose to appear somewhat unconventional.  They initially refused to adapt their behaviour to that of the other parties; an example of this is their refusal to elect a chairperson (Klubobmann/Klubobfrau) and designated a puppet made out of straw instead. Delegates would appear in parliament dressed in casual wear such as jeans and trainers. Worldwide attention was drawn when the Green delegate Andreas Wabl hoisted a swastika flag on the speakers podium in the Austrian parliament, protesting against then Federal President Kurt Waldheim.

After the national election in 2002, the Greens entered into preliminary negotiations about a possible coalition government with the conservative ÖVP.  During negotiations, party leadership was accused of internally black-mailing skeptical members.  Negotiations between the two parties were subsequently called off, after the results with the ÖVP were not sufficient.  The Green youth organisation Grünalternative Jugend (Green Alternative Youth or GAJ) briefly occupied the rooms of the Green parliamentary club in the Austrian parliament building in protest.

In 2003 three Green federal counsellors formed their own club in the Upper House Federal Council (Bundesrat) of Parliament.

After the 2006 elections the Greens gained four seats and ended up with 21 seats and became the third largest party in Parliament, however did not have enough mandates to form a coalition government with either the Austrian People's Party (ÖVP) or Social Democratic Party (SPÖ) and became the largest opposition party, while the SPÖ and ÖVP formed a grand coalition government.

The party suffered from internal struggles in 2017, losing its Youth wing (which split away and formed an ephemeral joint list with the Communist Party of Austria) and later experiencing a split of Peter Pilz's faction, forming the Peter Pilz List.

The 2017 legislative election saw a collapse for the party, scoring only 3.8% and losing its representation in the Nationalrat for the first time since 1986. Following the results, party spokesman Ingrid Felipe resigned from her post and was replaced by Werner Kogler.

The party saw a revival in the 2019 European election, in which they scored 14.1% and elected 2 MEPs. The election saw the collapse of JETZ.

The party eventually later this year, experienced a strong recovery and performed better well leading up to the 2019 snap legislative election, the Greens returned to the National Council with their best ever result in a legislative election, scoring 13.9% and electing 26 MPs, an upswing of 10.2% from 2017.

Chairpersons since 1986 

The chart below shows a timeline of the Green chairpersons and the Chancellors of Austria. The left green bar shows all the chairpersons (Bundessprecher, abbreviated as "CP") of the Green party, and the right bar shows the corresponding make-up of the Austrian government at that time. The red (SPÖ), black (ÖVP), and light grey (Independent) colours correspond to which party led the federal government (Bundesregierung, abbreviated as "Govern."). The last names of the respective chancellors are shown, the Roman numeral stands for the cabinets.

Federal state level
The Green party also entered the parliaments or assemblies (Landtag) of Austrian federal states and communal governments. Following is an analysis of the party on the federal state (Länder) level:

Burgenland 
The Burgenland Greens were able to take their seats in the federal state parliament (Landtag) for the first time in 2000. The party received 5.49% of the tally, which meant two mandates. In the federal state elections in 2005 these two seats were reaffirmed with 5.21% received of all votes cast.

Carinthia 
In the southernmost federal state Carinthia, different Green parties ran state elections: the KEL/AL in 1984, Anderes Kärnten in 1989 and 1994, and Demokratie 99 in 1999. These parties were, however, never able to enter the federal state assembly, since the Carinthian voting system requires a party to win a direct mandate in one of the four regional election districts, which effectively means a 10%-threshold in order to enter. 
Only in 2004 were the Carinthian Greens finally able to take their seats in the federal state assembly, where they are represented by cabaret artist Rolf Holub and Barbara Lesjak. On a regional level, for example in the federal state capital Klagenfurt, the Carinthian Greens have already played a political role for a longer time. In the Klagenfurt city council, the Greens are represented by Andrea Wulz, Matthias Koechl, Angelika Hoedl and Reinhold Gasper. Since the local election in 2003, the Klagenfurt Greens were able to take one of nine seats in the proportional city-government, Andrea Wulz is the town councillor for issues relating to women, family matters and social housing projects.

Lower Austria 
In 1998 the Lower Austrian Greens were represented with two delegates in the federal state assembly. In the federal state elections in 2003 the Greens received 7.22% and thus won four mandates, which enabled them to form a parliamentary group - called club in Austrian politics - in the assembly. With Madeleine Petrovic, the Lower Austrian Greens have a former federal spokeswoman and one of the most outspoken animal activists of Austria as their leader (Klubobfrau). In 2005 the Lower Austrian Greens managed to win and take their seats in 100 municipal assemblies and as of 2005 had four vice-mayors. Their managing director in Lower Austria is Thomas Huber.

Salzburg 
After the federal state elections in 1989 the Salzburg state Greens had two mandates in the Salzburg federal state assembly, in 1994 three and in 1999 again two. Under the leadership of Cyriak Schwaighofer the Greens performed under their expectations in the 2004 federal state elections and could not achieve the desired club status of at least three mandates. As voter-current analyses showed, the small increases in votes were largely due to former voters of the Liberal Forum (LiF), which did not run in the Salzburg elections. In March 2009 they were down from 8% to 7.3%, keeping their two seats in Salzburg state's parliament.

The Bürgerliste (Citizen List) is the common platform of the Greens in Salzburg municipality. Like many other autonomous municipal groups it carries its own name.

Styria 
The Styrian Greens have three delegates sitting in the federal state assembly, federal state spokesperson Lambert Schönleitner, Sandra Krautwaschl, and Lara Köck. There are two independent Greens parties: on the one hand the federal state party, on the other hand there is the Die Grünen - Alternative Liste Graz party for the federal state capital Graz. In the Graz city-council the Greens are represented by Sigi Binder, Lisa Rücker, Hermann Candussi and Christina Jahn.

Styria has the largest Austrian Green youth organization in Austria, called Grüne Jugend Steiermark (Green Youth Styria). Beside the Green Youth Styria there also exists Austria's first Green students' organization, the ECO Students.

Tyrol 
In Tyrol the Greens (official name: Die Grünen – die Grüne Alternative Tirol) were able to win seats and placed in 1994 Eva Lichtenberger as Austria's first Green state councillor in a local government, responsible for environmental affairs.

The 2003 Tyrolean Landtag (state assembly) elections were the best ever for the Austrian Greens, winning 15.59% of all votes cast. In the capital city of Innsbruck the Greens reached approximately 27% of the vote. The Tyrolean election result also meant that the Greens could for the first time in history nominate a member to the Upper House of Parliament. Since 2003 the Green delegate to the Federal Council (Bundesrat) of Parliament is Eva Konrad, former chairlady of the Austrian National Union of Students (Österreichische HochschülerInnenschaft) of the University of Innsbruck.

The communal elections of 2004 brought a doubling of the mandates for the Tyrolean Greens. City elections in Innsbruck in 2006 were a success for the Greens and they gained 8 of the 40 seats in the parliament of Innsbruck.

In the elections to the European parliament the Tyrolean Greens obtained 17.32%, their best result until then. Eva Lichtenberger subsequently changed her position to become a Member of the European Parliament (MEP). The results in Innsbruck were particularly good: there the Green party received 28.28%, which made it the strongest party, even before the Christian-democratic ÖVP and the social-democratic SPÖ. The Greens were able to score on a number of issues that they have been fighting for years. Besides the social topics above all the problems of transit traffic over the Alps was important.

The Tyrolean Greens have experts on traffic issues with MEP Eva Lichtenberger, the national speaker and club chairperson Georg Willi and the speaker of group of regional of Innsbruck Gerhard Fritz. The issue of transit traffic through the Tyrol is of great importance, because the state is troubled by the massive transit traffic between Germany and Italy over the Brenner Pass. Since the Tyrol sits right in between Germany and Italy, the bulk of the commercial traffic passes through there. This heavy-duty traffic has devastating effects on the fragile alpine environment and decreases the quality of life for the inhabitants. Since the entry to the European Union, Austria had to give up any quota limitations on how much international traffic coming from EU-countries is allowed to pass through its territory.

The Tyrolean Greens accused the federal government of not having pushed for a better deal with the European Union concerning transit-traffic and in effect abandoning the concerns of the citizens. They also heavily criticised the government's failure to negotiate a follow-up of the 1994 transit-treaty signed with the EU. Apart from the Greens, various anti-transit civic movements have formed to protest against the environmental damages caused by the traffic.

Sitting in the National Council is Kurt Grünewald, a Tyrolean member of parliament, as well as the former leader of the Greens Alexander Van der Bellen, who has Tyrolean roots (he spent a part of his youth there and went to high school in Innsbruck).

The results of the Tyrolean Landtag elections:

2003 delegates: Sepp Brugger, Maria Scheiber, Uschi Schwarzl, Elisabeth Wiesmüller und Georg Willi (club chairman);
1999 delegates: Maria Scheiber, Elisabeth Wiesmüller, Georg Willi (club chairman); 
1994 delegates: Bernhard Ernst, Franz Klug, Max Schneider und Georg Willi (club chairman [Klubobmann]); 
1989 delegates: Eva Lichtenberger, Jutta Seethaler, Franz Klug.

Upper Austria 
In 1997 the Upper Austrian Greens successfully entered the Upper Austrian Landtag (state assembly) for the first time. After the state elections in 2003 (state elections in Upper Austria are held every six years, not five like in the other states), the Greens were able to win even more seats. The campaign was already aimed at gaining ministerial seats in the state government. Since the conservative Christian-democratic ÖVP was the strongest party, this would have meant for the Greens to enter into a coalition government with them (the so-called "Schwarz-Grün" [Black-Green] coalition, named after the party-colours). This new political constellation was quite controversial amongst party members on both sides. In the Green party, the leader Rudi Anschober was able to convince party members and after some dealing became state councillor for environmental affairs. The Greens of the state capital of Linz under the leadership of city councillor Jürgen Himmelbauer were most against this black-green project.

On the national level, the Upper Austrian Greens were able to nominate and send to the parliamentary Upper House Federal Council (Bundesrat) councillor Ruperta Lichtenecker.

Vorarlberg 
The Vorarlberg Greens were the first to ever win mandates in an Austrian state assembly election. Already in 1984 they were able to win 13% of the votes in the Vorarlberg state assembly elections, which for that time was an absolute sensation. The charismatic alpine farmer Kaspanaze Simma from Bregenzerwald was the leading candidate, it was mainly due to his efforts why the party was so instantly successful.  Because of their strength, the Greens were allowed to form their own parliamentary fraction (Klub), which caused some logistical problems as the newly constructed Landtag building in 1981 only provided space for the traditional three parties (ÖVP, SPÖ, FPÖ), not four.  Since the traditional organic farming sector is important in the western Austrian regions, the Greens were able to gain support.

In the following years the Greens were able to consolidate their position by gaining seats on the communal and municipal level.  Occasionally they lost their official club status in the state assembly, when they fared poorly from 1999 to 2004.  In 2006 the speaker of the Vorarlberg Greens was Johannes Rauch.

The results of the Vorarlberg Landtag elections:

1 Combined result of ALÖ and VGÖ

Vienna 
The Viennese Greens started nominating candidates in the Vienna Gemeinderat (municipal council or state assembly) in 1983 and were able to enter in 1991. Over the years they have been able to continually gather support. A lot of support has been coming from former Liberal Forum voters, after the liberals failed to enter any legislature. The traditional strongholds in Vienna for the Greens are the districts of Neubau (2005: 43.26%), Josefstadt (32.26%), Alsergrund (29.43%), Mariahilf (28.97%) and Wieden (25.14%).

In the 2001 Gemeinderat elections, the Greens were able to win the majority of a district for the first time. In the district of Neubau they won 32.55% and were able to nominate the Bezirksvorsteher (mayor of the district). The results of 2001 also allowed the Viennese Greens to nominate Stefan Schennach as federal councilor to the Upper House of Parliament (Bundesrat). But despite the strong gains, the Greens were not able to enter into a coalition government with the SPÖ, since the social-democrats were able to win an absolute majority.

The 2004 European Parliament election were the best for the Viennese Greens so far. From the total tally, they received 22%, which put them ahead of the Christian-democratic ÖVP and placed them on second position behind the SPÖ (37.7%). In Neubau the Greens received 41%. They were also able to win first place in the districts of Wieden, Mariahilf, Josefstadt and Alsergrund.

In the 2005 Gemeinderat elections, the Greens were able to win votes, but missed their target of becoming the second most powerful party and ended up on fourth place, right behind the right-wing Freedom Party (FPÖ). Because of the different weighing by districts, the Greens received 14 mandates, one more than the FPÖ. They were also able to place another city-councillor. In the districts, the party was able to consolidate their holding on Neubau, as well as win the majority of votes in Josefstadt. With that, the Greens were able to nominate a second Green district-mayor. The second place was won in the districts of Leopoldstadt, Margareten, Mariahilf, Rudolfsheim-Fünfhaus and Alsergrund.

The Green delegates to the Viennese Gemeinderat or Landtag as of 2006 were: Maria Vassilakou (club-chairlady [Klubobfrau]), Waltraut Antonov, Heidi Cammerlander, Christoph Chorherr, Sabine Gretner, Susanne Jerusalem, Alev Korun, Rüdiger Maresch, Martin Margulies, Sigrid Pilz, Ingrid Puller, Marie Ringler, Marco Schreuder, Claudia Sommer-Smolik. The two city-councillors are David Ellensohn and Monika Vana.

The 2010 results meant that the SPÖ was unable to hold the majority of seats in the Vienna city council and therefore had to rule together with the Greens performing for the first time as coalition partner. The current vice-governor/vice-mayor of Vienna as of 26 June 2019 is Birgit Hebein.

The results of the Viennese Gemeinderat elections:

1 ran as Alternative Liste Wien (ALW)

Organisation
In 2004 the Greens had about 3,000 members nationwide, although at present there are no uniform regulations for membership. Apart from the members, the Greens rely on a large number of volunteers. The party used to function on the principles of grassroots democracy (Basisdemokratie) and rotation principle (Rotationsprinzip), but this was stopped in the course of the time. The last basic-democratic element is the Urabstimmung, which is a vote on any issue that can be initiated with the petition of at least 100 members. As of 2003 however, no such vote has taken place.

The highest body is the Federal Congress (Bundeskongress), which convenes at least once a year. All federal state organisations send delegates, also the immigrants-organisation is allowed to send delegates as "the tenth Austrian state". The Federal Congress decides the electoral lists for the National Council elections and elections to the European parliament. The congress also elects the federal spokesperson (BundesprecherIn). The congress also decides the party program and sets the party guidelines.

In the last few years, the federal executive (Bundesvorstand)  has developed into the actual decision-making centre. It meets at least once a week, mostly on Tuesdays, and determines the guidelines of daily politics. The federal executive also decides on party finances.
The extended federal executive (Erweiterter Bundesvorstand) consists of a smaller number of delegates from each state and meets at least once a month. It takes care of the implementation of the party-guidelines, which were set by the party congress. It also chooses the representatives of the party spokesperson.

The highest office in the party is that of the federal spokesperson (Bundessprecher). The party's federal spokesman is Werner Kogler.

The federal state organisations (Landesorganisationen) are organised similarly: There are federal state meetings, which sometimes convene as a members meeting or a delegates meeting. Similar to the federal executive, there are federal state executives (Landesvorstände). The party charter also allows for each federal state group to hold a vote on basic issues as well that affect the whole party.

Independently in the National Council there also exists a Green National Council Club (faction), which can independently specify its guidelines. In recent years however an increasing fusion of the work between party and its club was noticeable. Michaela Sburny, successor of Franz Raft since June 2004 as the Greens' federal chairperson, was allowed to keep her National Council mandate. This means she is allowed to hold two offices at the same time, something that was frowned upon by the Greens previously.

There are different Green or Greenish organisations within the party and associated with it. These include:
 The Grünen Andersrum is the gay-, lesbian and transgender organisation, which is organised differently from state to state, and exists in all states except Vorarlberg and Burgenland. In Vienna, the Grünen Andersrum are a part of the party itself.
 The Grünen SeniorInnen (DGS) is the organisation for senior citizens. It was founded on March 9, 2001, in Vienna. The DGS fights for a policy more friendly to senior citizens and their right to lead an active, fulfilling and self-determined life.
 The Initiative Grüne MigrantInnen (IGM) is the Green group for immigrants in Austria. Their demands are a facilitation of integration into life in Austria, equal rights and equal opportunities, fight against racism and other issues concerning migrants.
 The Grüne und Alternative Studierende (GRAS) is a separate party which candidates in the elections for the Austrian National Union of Students (Österreichische HochschülerInnenschaft – ÖH). There they are the biggest faction, together with the Socialist Students of Austria (Verband Sozialistischer StudentInnen Österreichs – VSStÖ) they form the executive committee of the Austrian National Union for Students.
 The Grünalternative Jugend (GAJ) is the youth organisation of the Green party. The GAJ existed since the 1990s. It is a member of the Federation of Young European Greens (FYEG). The GAJ sees itself rather as extreme left. The organisation is subdivided into smaller groups for each state.
 The Grüne Frauenorganisation is the organisation for women. As of 2005, it does not exist yet in every state.
 ECO Students is a Green student's organisation, which currently only exists in Styria.
 The Grüne Wirtschaft is the Green economic organisation and runs in the elections for the Economic Parliament of the Austrian Federal Economic Chamber (Wirtschaftskammer Österreich – WKÖ).
 The Alternative und Unabhängige GewerkschafterInnen (AUGE/UG) is the Green labour union. It runs in the elections for the labour parliament of the Austrian Labour Chamber (Arbeiterkammer – AK).

The education and training of new Green politicians is done by the Grüne Bildungswerkstatt, which is an independent voluntary association. The Grüne Bildungswerkstatt is financed by the republic, as regulated by Austrian law for the equal treatment of all parliamentary parties.

Electoral results

National Council

President

In the 2016 Austrian presidential election, Alexander Van der Bellen won the election with 50.35% of the votes and defeated Norbert Hofer the Freedom Party of Austria politician who received 49.65% of the vote. Van der Bellen became the first president from the Greens. On 1 July, the Constitutional Court overturned the result of the election and ordered a re-run because of irregularities during the counting process. On 4 December 2016 Van der Bellen won the re-run of the second round with 53.79% of the votes to Hofer's 46.21%.

European Parliament

State Parliaments

Results timeline

Prominent members
Among the most notable founding members and mentors are or were Professor Alexander Tollmann, the painter Friedensreich Hundertwasser, actor Herbert Fux, the mayor of Steyregg Josef Buchner (the first Green mayor in Austria – in 1987 excluded from the Green parliamentary club), Freda Meissner-Blau and Günther Nenning, with Nobel prize laureate Konrad Lorenz supporting the 1984 protests at Hainburg.

Today, Green politicians include (in alphabetical order)

 Rudolf Anschober (State councillor of Upper Austria)
 Thomas Blimlinger (Mayor of the Viennese district Neubau)
 Dieter Brosz (former MP (former member of the lower house National Council), spokesman for education)
 Christoph Chorherr (Member of the state assembly of Vienna)
 Eva Glawischnig-Piesczek (former MP, former federal spokeswoman)
 Werner Kogler (federal spokesperson)
 Ulrike Lunacek (former MEP, former spokeswoman for foreign policy)
 Karl Oellinger (former MP, deputy federal speaker)
 Madeleine Petrovic (Club chairperson of the Lower Austrian Greens)
 Johannes Rauch, (Club chairperson and state speaker for Vorarlberg)
 Marie Ringler, (former Member of the Viennese state assembly, spokeswoman for culture and technology)
 Michaela Sburny (former MP, Spokeswoman for the economy, former Federal Executive Manager of the party)
 Terezija Stoisits (Ombudswoman, former MP and spokeswoman for minorities)
 Ingrid Lechner Sonnek (Club chairperson of the Styrian Greens)
 Alexander Van der Bellen (former Federal Speaker, club chairman in the National Council), President of Austria
 Maria Vassilakou (Club chairperson of the Viennese Greens, Vice Mayor)
 Georg Willi (Club chairperson and state speaker for the Tyrol)

Members of the European Parliament
 Mercedes Echerer (MEP from 1999 to 2004)
 Eva Lichtenberger (MEP since 2004, member of the Austrian national convention)
 Johannes Voggenhuber (MEP from 1995 to 2009, Member of the European Convention, member of the Charter of Fundamental Rights of the European Union)
 Ulrike Lunacek (2009–2017)

See also
Green party
Green politics
List of environmental organizations
Anti-nuclear movement in Austria

Notes

References

External links

Die Grünen - official website (in German)
Austrian Greens in the European Parliament
Die Grünen Austria at European Greens
The Green Parties Country Studies - Austria

Political parties established in 1993
1993 establishments in Austria
European Green Party
Global Greens member parties
Green parties in Europe
Feminist parties
Parties represented in the European Parliament
Pro-European political parties in Austria